As a result of the water supply crisis during the severe 1997–2009 drought State governments around Australia began building desalination plants that purify seawater using reverse osmosis technology. Many of these plants have included in their overall cost the building of renewable energy sources such as wind farms.

Australia's first working desalination plant was the Perth Seawater Desalination Plant that was completed in November 2006. A second plant on the Gold Coast began operations in February 2009. The Kurnell Desalination Plant in Sydney was opened on 28 January 2010.

List of desalination plants

Desalination plants in use

Smaller desalination plants

Secondary desalination plants, citations'''

Desalination plants in development or cancelled

See also
Energy in Australia
Seawater desalination in Australia

References

 
Lists of buildings and structures in Australia